Seifeddine Jaziri (born 12 February 1993) is a Tunisian professional footballer who plays as a forward for Egyptian Premier League club Zamalek and the Tunisia national team.

Career statistics
Scores and results list Tunisia's goal tally first, score column indicates score after each Jaziri goal.

Honours
Club Africain
Tunisian Ligue Professionnelle 1: 2014–15
Tunisian Cup: 2016–17

Zamalek
Egyptian Premier League 2020–21, 2021-22
Egypt Cup: 2020–21

Individual
FIFA Arab Cup Golden Boot: 2021

References

1993 births
Living people
Footballers from Tunis
Tunisian footballers
Association football forwards
Tunisia international footballers
Tunisia youth international footballers
Tunisian Ligue Professionnelle 1 players
Egyptian Premier League players
Club Africain players
CS Hammam-Lif players
US Ben Guerdane players
Tanta SC players
Stade Gabèsien players
Al Mokawloon Al Arab SC players
Zamalek SC players
Tunisian expatriate footballers
Tunisian expatriate sportspeople in Egypt
Expatriate footballers in Egypt
2021 Africa Cup of Nations players
Tunisia A' international footballers
2016 African Nations Championship players
2022 FIFA World Cup players